Thos. Moser is a handmade-furniture company in Maine, United States. Founded by Thomas and Mary Moser in 1972, in New Gloucester, Maine, it has grown from a one-man operation to employing around seventy craftsmen. Since 1987, the business has been based in Auburn, Maine, working out of a  workshop. It has showrooms in Freeport, Maine; Washington, D.C.; Boston, Massachusetts; and San Francisco, California. It formerly had  showrooms in New York City and Philadelphia, Pennsylvania.

The company has designed and built furniture for the George W. Bush Presidential Center (in which it has fifty-five pieces), the Ronald Reagan Presidential Library, and has made ceremonial seating for Pope Benedict XVI and Pope Francis.

History 
Tom and Mary Moser established Thos. Moser on February 2, 1972. The company's first advertisement, placed in Down East Magazine, read:Aaron Moser took over the business in 2017.

In 2018, Thos. Moser collaborated with L.L.Bean to produce a limited-edition fly-tying desk.

Tom Moser 
Moser was born in Chicago, Illinois, in 1935. His father, Josef, was an Austrian immigrant. His mother died when Tom was fourteen; his father followed four years later.

In 1957, his freshman year at college, he married Mary Wilson, with whom he had four sons: Aaron, Andrew, David and Matthew. The couple met when they were fourteen and twelve years old, respectively.

Moser is a United States Air Force veteran, having joined at the age of 18 after quitting high school. After serving four years in Greenland, he returned to his studies by attending the State University of New York. He went on to graduate school at the University of Michigan and at Cornell University, receiving a Doctor of Philosophy in speech communications.

After moving to Maine in 1966, Moser became a professor of language and speech pathology at the University of Maine in Orono, firstly, then at Bates College in Lewiston.

He wrote How to Build Shaker Furniture in 1977. He has also penned Windsor Chairmaking, Shop Drawings of American Furniture, Artistry in Wood and Legacy in Wood.

References

External links 

 

American furniture designers
American furniture makers
American woodworkers
1972 establishments in Maine
Auburn, Maine
American companies established in 1972